The Lancaster Barnstormers (colloquially known as the Stormers) are an American professional baseball team based in Lancaster, Pennsylvania. They are a member of the North Division of the Atlantic League of Professional Baseball, a "partner league" of Major League Baseball. The Barnstormers have played their home games at Clipper Magazine Stadium in the city's Northwest Corridor since 2005. 

The team's name, selected in a fan ballot, refers to the tradition of "barnstorming," which means to travel around an area appearing in exhibition sports events, especially baseball games. The term was used to describe Lancaster's baseball teams as early as 1906 when the Lancaster Daily Intelligencer reported, "There was a crowd of between seven and eight hundred persons out on Friday to see the Lancaster barnstormers play the Philadelphia Giants." Their original primary logo incorporated the colors red, navy blue, and khaki previously used by the Lancaster Red Roses of affiliated Minor League Baseball from 1940 to 1961. The name and logo also allude to Lancaster's Pennsylvania Dutch agricultural heritage.

History

Prior Lancaster teams

Baseball first came to Lancaster County in the 1860s by soldiers returning home from the Civil War. They learned the rules while serving in the military and wanted to continue playing. The very first professional baseball teams in Lancaster were the Lancaster Lancasters and the Lancaster Ironsides. The Lancasters played in the Keystone Association while the Ironsides played in the Eastern League, both starting in 1884. The following season, the Lancasters joined the Eastern League, and the two teams became rivals. They competed against each other for fan support, league affiliation, and money at the gate. At its peak, insults and refusals to play against each other were the norm. The teams finally agreed to play each other at the end of the 1884 season, in which the Ironsides defeated the Lancasters after seven very close games. Only the Lancasters continued play the next season.

In the 1894 to 1895 seasons, a team called the Lancaster Chicks played in the Keystone Association. An all-African-American team called the Lancaster Giants followed in 1887, and many Lancastrians supported the team despite the social pressure of the day. The Giants hosted many exhibition games against the Philadelphia Giants of the Keystone Club.

Between 1896 and 1899, the first team called the Lancaster Maroons played in the original Atlantic League. In 1905, the second inception of the Maroons played in the Tri-State League.

In 1906, the Maroons became the Lancaster Red Roses. As both teams were named for the opposing factions in England's historic Wars of the Roses, the name change infuriated the rival White Roses from the nearby city of York.

The Barnstormers

In 2003, the Atlantic League of Professional Baseball formally announced an expansion team for the city of Lancaster. In November 2004, the Barnstormers announced the signing of Tom Herr, a Major League Baseball veteran and Lancaster native, as the team's first manager. The Barnstormers' were set to begin competition in 2005 at the newly built Clipper Magazine Stadium.

On May 11, they lost their first game, 4–3, to the Atlantic City Surf, in front of 7,300 fans. They finished the 2005 season with a record of 64 wins and 76 losses. In finishing the first half of the 2006 season with a record of 38–25, the Barnstormers qualified for their first Atlantic League playoff berth. They also won the second half, posting a record of 37–26. After defeating division challenger, Atlantic City, in the first round of the playoffs, the Barnstormers swept the Bridgeport Bluefish to win their first Atlantic League championship, in only their second season. Pitcher Denny Harriger threw a complete game, breaking a franchise record for consecutive pitches. It was the city of Lancaster's first professional championship since 1955, when the former Red Roses won the Piedmont League title. The Barnstormers played in the 2012 Atlantic League Championship Series but were ultimately defeated by the Long Island Ducks in Game 5. In 2012, the Lancaster Barnstormers set an Atlantic League record with 88 wins.

Herr managed the team from 2005 to 2006 and from 2009 to 2010. In 2008, the Barnstormers were coached by Von Hayes, a former teammate of Herr from the 1989 and 1990 Philadelphia Phillies. Rick Wise, the winning pitcher for the Boston Red Sox in Game 6 of the 1975 World Series, is also a managerial alumnus of the Lancaster Barnstormers. He was the team's third base coach from the inaugural 2005 season to the end of the 2008 campaign. Herr, in his second term, was succeeded by Butch Hobson.

The Lancaster Barnstormers were originally owned by Opening Day Partners (ODP), a company that specializes in baseball club and stadium operations. ODP also created Atlantic League clubs in York, Pennsylvania, Southern Maryland, and Sugar Land, Texas. On November 12, 2014, ODP transitioned their ownership of the Barnstormers to Lancaster Baseball, LLC. Lancaster Baseball consists of  Ian Ruzow, Rob Liss, Steve Zuckerman, and Bob Zuckerman. Ian Ruzow was born in South Africa and moved to the USA in 1980. The other three partners are all natives of New York, and all four have lived in Lancaster for 40 years. Steve Zuckerman, Ian Ruzow and Bob Zuckerman were the founders of Clipper Magazine, with Rob Liss joining them a few years later. Clipper Magazine has owned the naming rights to the stadium since 2005.

Logos and uniforms

The primary colors of the Barnstormers are red, black, khaki, and white. These are similar to the colors previously used by the Red Roses to reflect the area's baseball heritage. The primary logo consists of a typical red barn outlined in black with a curving baseball. Unlike most sports logos, the geographical location is prominently featured rather than the team nickname, thus emphasizing the Lancaster community. In 2011, the Barnstormers substituted black for navy blue and unveiled three agriculture-themed alternate logos: a hex sign, a weather vane, and the barn-planked "LB" initials. The hex-sign logo incorporates the team's initials and a Pennsylvania Dutch design complete with a baseball and two crossed bats. Additionally, it includes two red roses symbolizing Lancaster's nickname, "Red Rose City."

For the 2019 season, Atlantic League clubs partnered with Outdoor Cap for its on-field headwear. The Barnstormers home cap is red, charged with a stylized cursive L in white with black and khaki outline interweaving with a curving baseball. The home jerseys are white with red piping and the cursive "Stormers" wordmark across the front in red and black. The away jersey is solid gray, featuring the blocked "Lancaster" wordmark in red with black outline. The alternate jersey is red with the L cap logo. The Barnstormers wear red belts, socks, and undershirts with all uniforms.

In 2016, the Atlantic League partnered with Rawlings to design unique catcher's gear for all eight teams. The design for the Barnstormers features a golden sunrise over a red barn, symbolizing the Lancaster County's agricultural heritage.

Season-by-season records

 3 Atlantic League Championships (2006, 2014, 2022)

Culture

War of the Roses

Radio and television

Every Barnstormers game was broadcast on WLAN (1390 AM) and WPDC (1600 AM) by Dave Collins, their announcer. Select home games are televised on Blue Ridge Cable-11. However, the cost of airtime became too expensive so all games are now only streamed on YouTube.

Mascot

The Lancaster Barnstormers' mascot is an anthropomorphic, red cow named Cylo. He wears the team's home jersey with striped socks and retro-style sneakers. Cylo debuted on March 4, 2005, at the Mascot Roller Mill in the Lancaster County village of Mascot. His name in full is Cyloicious L. Barnstormer, alluding to Hall of Fame pitcher Cy Young and to silos, representing the county's agricultural heritage. The mascot was designed by the Raymond Entertainment Group, which also produces the Phillie Phanatic's costume.

Roster

Retired numbers 

 42 (Jackie Robinson) 2B, Retired throughout professional baseball on April 15, 1997

Major League Baseball alumni

References

External links

 Lancaster Barnstormers (official website)
 Lancaster Barnstormers Booster Club

 
Atlantic League of Professional Baseball teams
Culture of Lancaster, Pennsylvania
Professional baseball teams in Pennsylvania
Sports in Lancaster, Pennsylvania
Opening Day Partners
Baseball teams established in 2003
2003 establishments in Pennsylvania